The 2013 Rugby Football League Championship, which will be known as Kingstone Press Championship due to sponsorship by Kingstone Press Cider, is a semi-professional rugby league football competition played in the UK, one tier below the first tier Super League. The 2013 season is the first season to consist of a 14-team division. This was achieved by scrapping relegation for the 2012 season and having four teams promoted from the Championship 1.

Relegation to Championship 1 is restored for the 2013 but as in previous years, there is no automatic promotion from this league to Super League, which uses a licensing system renewed every three years. Qualifying for the Grand Final or winning the Northern Rail Cup is a prerequisite for Championship clubs to be able to apply for a licence in the next round of applications for the 2015–17 seasons.

All of the teams in the 2013 Co-operative Championship will also compete in the 2013 Challenge Cup where they will enter in the third round. All of the teams will also compete in the 2013 National League Cup which starts before the Co-operative Championship with the finals held mid season.

Teams
This year's competition features the same 10 teams as it did in 2012 plus the top four teams from the 2012 Championship 1 season, which are Barrow Raiders, Doncaster, Whitehaven and Workington Town.

Season standings

Season results

The regular league season sees the 14 teams play each other twice (one home, one away) over 26 matches. The top eight teams at the end of the regular season goes through to the play-offs to determine the winners of the Championship.

See also
 Co-operative Championship
 2013 Championship 1
 British rugby league system
 Super League
 Rugby League Conference
 Northern Ford Premiership
 National League Cup
 Rugby League Reserve Team Championship

References

External links
Official Website

2013 in English rugby league
Rugby Football League Championship